The 2009 Australian Superkart season covers national level Superkart racing in Australia during 2009. There were three national level race meetings in 2009 all held on the calendar of the Shannons Nationals Motor Racing Championships, the first two covered the Australian Superkart Championship, which was won by Sam Zavaglia. The third event, the stand-alone Pacific Superkart Challenge, was won by Warren McIlveen.

Featured events

Australian Superkart Championship
The 2009 Australian Superkart Championship was the 21st running of the national championships for Superkarts.  It began on 6 June 2009 at Mallala Motor Sport Park and end on 19 July at Eastern Creek Raceway after eight races. It was contested for two engine capacity based classes, 250 cc International (incorporating 250 National Class) and 125 cc. 125cc champion was Melbourne teenager, Steven Tamasi.

A third national level event was held later in the season at Morgan Park Raceway which was held for the 250 International, 125cc, the recently superseded 85cc class and the Rotax Max non-gearbox category.

Non-Gearbox Superkart Championship
With insufficient pre-registration, non-Gearbox Rotax Max championship was not contested in 2009.

Teams and drivers
The following drivers competed in the 2009 Australian Superkart Championship. The series consisted of two rounds, with four races at each meeting. With only four competitors appearing from the 250 National class all season, the 250 Nationals were merged into the 250 International class.

Results and standings

Gearbox race calendar
The 2009 www.artmotorsport.com.au Australian Superkart Championship season consisted of two rounds. Four races were held at both race meetings. Likewise four races were held at the Pacific Superkart Challenge.

Drivers Championship
Points were awarded 20-17-15-13-11-10-9-8-7-6-5-4-3-2-1 based on the top fifteen race positions in first three races of each round. The fourth race of each round, which is longer than the others (eight laps vs five laps) awarded points for the top twenty race positions at 25-22-20-18-16-15-14-13-12–11-10-9-8-7-6-5-4-3-2-1. Points sourced from in part:

Rockpress Pacific Superkart Challenge
Points were awarded 401-300-225-169-127-95-71 based on the top race positions in each classe in each of the four races. There was an additional bonus points structure added, multiplying the points received by the number of karts entered in that competitors class, divided by the total number of entries for the field.

References

External links
 Official championship website
 CAMS Manual reference to Australian titles

Superkart
Australian Superkart Championship